Pripiceni-Răzeși is a commune in Rezina District, Moldova. It is composed of two villages, Pripiceni-Curchi and Pripiceni-Răzeși.

References

Communes of Rezina District